Homero Richards (born June 8, 1976) is a Mexican race car driver from Mexico City. Richards won back-to-back championships in the Panam GP Series (Latin American Formula Renault championship), in 2004 and 2005. He made his first and only Champ Car World Series start in 2005 at Autódromo Hermanos Rodríguez.

In 2006, he switched from open-wheel to stock cars, and started to compete in the NASCAR Corona Series. He drove the #20 Nextel car for H&H Racing, a team he co-owns with his brother Horacio. In 2014, he switched from Nextel to AXTEL M Racing team. He now races for Escudería Grupo TOP in the NASCAR PEAK Mexico Series

Complete Champ Car Results
(key)

References

External links

1976 births
Living people
Champ Car drivers
French Formula Renault 2.0 drivers
Formula Renault Eurocup drivers
HVM Racing drivers
LATAM Challenge Series drivers
Latin America Formula Renault 2000 drivers
Mexican people of English descent
Mexican racing drivers
NASCAR drivers
North American Formula Renault drivers
Racing drivers from Mexico City